Starina is a rural locality (a village) in Verkhnevarzhenskoye Rural Settlement, Velikoustyugsky District, Vologda Oblast, Russia. The population was 2 as of 2002.

Geography 
Starina is located 67 km southeast of Veliky Ustyug (the district's administrative centre) by road. Minino is the nearest rural locality.

References 

Rural localities in Velikoustyugsky District